Shadab Bashir Jakati (born 27 November 1980) is a former Indian cricketer. He is a left-handed batsman and a slow left arm orthodox bowler. He represented Goa in first class cricket and also played for Chennai Super Kings, Royal Challengers Bangalore and Gujarat Lions in the Indian Premier League.

Career 
Jakati made his first class cricket debut in the 1998/99 season for Goa.

In 2008, Shadab Jakati used the IPL to get out of cricketing obscurity. A left-arm orthodox spinner, Jakati got appreciable turn from the South African pitches and was crucial to Chennai Super Kings' surge in the middle stages of the 2009 tournament. He claimed four-fors in back-to-back games, a remarkable achievement in twenty overs, to announce himself. He took 13 wickets in the 2010 IPL season and was part of the CSK team which emerged as champions for the first time during the 2010 edition of the IPL.

In 2014, he was purchased by the Royal Challengers Bangalore, but only played one game in the season; against his former team CSK. He played for the Gujarat Lions in the 2017 season before entering politics. He had played his last first class match in October 2017 and he announced his retirement from playing cricket on 28 December 2019.

He was appointed as the director of cricket operations of the Colombo Kings franchise ahead of the 2020 Lanka Premier League.

References

External links
 
 Shadab Jakati - RoyalChallengers
 

1980 births
Living people
Chennai Super Kings cricketers
Goa cricketers
India Green cricketers
South Zone cricketers
Indian cricketers
Cricketers from Goa
People from Vasco da Gama, Goa
Indian Muslims
Gujarat Lions cricketers
Royal Challengers Bangalore cricketers
Goa Forward Party politicians